The Rector of the Franz Joseph University was the university's highest officer, elected in May or June every year on the proposal of the faculties. On the same occasions the Deans were also chosen, who, together with the Pro-Rector and the Pro-Deans (the office-holders of the previous school year) formed the university council (Senate) with the Rector being its head.

The internal affairs of the institution were regulated by the Article XIX of 1872, titled "Regarding the establishment and provisional organization of the Hungarian Royal University of Kolozsvár" and accepted by the Hungarian Parliament on 12 October 1872.

List of rectors

The history of the Franz Joseph University can be divided to three periods; the first one ran from the foundation (1872) until the end of the World War I, subsequently the university was forced into exile and moved its seat from Kolozsvár (Cluj-Napoca) first to Budapest (1919) and later to Szeged (1921). The Szeged-era lasted until 1940, when in accordance with the Second Vienna Award, Northern Transylvania including Kolozsvár was ceded back to Hungary and the university was relocated to its old home. In 1945, after the Soviet and Romanian forces took over the city, the Franz Joseph University ceased its operation and ended its 73 years history without legal successor. During this period, the institution had 74 rectors, including Bálint Kolosváry and Béla Reinbold, who held the position twice, and Dezső Veszprémy and Béla Issekutz who did not complete their one-year term.

Foundation and development period
 1872–73 — Áron Berde
 1873–74 — Vilmos Schulek, Béla Machik
 1874–75 — Henrik Finály
 1875–76 — Géza Entz
 1876–77 — Gusztáv Groisz
 1877–78 — Antal Generisch
 1878–79 — Sándor Imre
 1879–80 — Sámuel Brassai
 1880–81 — Károly Haller
 1881–82 — Sándor Ajtai K.
 1882–83 — Károly Szabó
 1883–84 — Antal Abt
 1884–85 — Viktor Csiky
 1885–86 — János Maizner
 1886–87 — János Szamosi
 1887–88 — Ágost Kanitz
 1888–89 — Sándor Kolosváry
 1889–90 — Nándor Klug
 1890–91 — Béla Szász
 1891–92 — Antal Koch
 1892–93 — Kelemen Óvári
 1893–94 — József Brandt
 1894–95 — Hugó Meltzl
 1895–96 — Lajos Martin
 1896–97 — Lajos Farkas
 1897–98 — Károly Lechner
 1898–99 — Adolf Terner
 1899–1900 — Rudolf Fabinyi
 1900–01 — Gábor Vályi
 1901–02 — József Lőte
 1902–03 — Lajos Schilling
 1903–04 — István Apáthy
 1904–05 — Mór Kiss
 1905–06 — Dénes Szabó
 1906–07 — Gergely Moldován
 1907–08 — Gyula Farkas
 1908–09 — György Jancsó
 1909–10 — László Udránszky
 1910–11 — Lajos Szádeczky-Kardoss
 1911–12 — Gyula Szádeczky-Kardoss
 1912–13 — Ignác Kosutány
 1913–14 — Balázs Kenyeres
 1914–15 — Sándor Márki
 1915–16 — Károly Tangl
 1916–17 — Adolf Lukáts
 1917–18 — Gusztáv Rigler
 1918–19 — István Schneller

In exile
 1919–20 — Bálint Kolosváry
 1920–21 — Bálint Kolosváry
 1921–22 — Gáspár Menyhárt
 1922–23 — Péter Pfeiffer
 1923–24 — Dezső Veszprémy, Béla Reinbold
 1924–25 — János Csengery
 1925–26 — Frigyes Riesz
 1926–27 — Károly Tóth
 1927–28 — Béla Reinbold, Béla Issekutz
 1928–29 — Lajos Dézsi
 1929–30 — István Győrffy
 1930–31 — Ferenc Kováts
 1931–32 — Elemér Veress
 1932–33 — Henrik Schmidt
 1933–34 — Tibor Széki
 1934–35 — Albert Kiss
 1935–36 — Gábor Ditrói
 1936–37 — László Gyula Erdélyi
 1937–38 — József Gelei
 1938–39 — István Ereky
 1939–40 — József Baló

Final years
 1940–41 — György Bartók
 1941–42 — Zsigmond Szentpétery
 1942–43 — Béla Kovrig
 1943–44 — László Buza
 1944–45 — Dezső Miskolczy

References

Notes
 

Franz Joseph University

hu:Kolozsvári Magyar Királyi Ferenc József Tudományegyetem#Az egyetem rektorai